Weyanoke is an unincorporated community in West Feliciana Parish, Louisiana, United States. Weyanoke has a post office with ZIP code 70787. Some sites that are listed on the National Register of Historic Places within Weyanoke are St. Mary's Episcopal Church and Rosebank Plantation House.

References

Unincorporated communities in West Feliciana Parish, Louisiana
Unincorporated communities in Louisiana